Łajs  is a village in the administrative district of Gmina Purda, within Olsztyn County, Warmian-Masurian Voivodeship, in northern Poland. It is located at the historic border between Warmia and Masuria.

The village has a population of 33.

References

Villages in Olsztyn County